The discography of American Christian rock band Third Day consists of thirteen studio albums, three extended plays (EPs), two compilation albums, three live albums, seven music videos, thirty-nine singles and sixty-five other appearances.

Discography

Independent albums

Studio albums

Live albums

Compilation albums

Holiday albums

EPs

Singles

1996–1999

2000–2018

Other charting songs

Video albums

Music videos
This is a list of the music videos made by Third Day.

Other album appearances 
This is a list of other album appearances by Third Day on various albums.

Notes

References

Discographies of American artists
Christian music discographies
Rock music group discographies